Steve Winwood is the debut solo studio album by blue-eyed soulster Steve Winwood. It was released in 1977, three years after the break-up of his former band, Traffic. Though the album sold moderately well in the US, it was a commercial disappointment compared to Traffic's recent albums, peaking at number 22 on the Billboard 200 album chart. In the UK, however, while Traffic's recent albums had only been moderately successful, Steve Winwood reached number 12 on The Official Charts. Island Records launched two singles from the album, "Hold On" and "Time Is Running Out", both of which failed to make the charts.

Reception

Reviewing in Christgau's Record Guide: Rock Albums of the Seventies (1981), Robert Christgau wrote: "Combined with Stomu Yamashta's ersatz electronic classicism on Go, Winwood's chronic meandering seemed vaguely interesting. On its own again, it just seems vague."

Track listing
All songs written by Steve Winwood and Jim Capaldi, except where noted.

Side one
"Hold On" – 4:32
"Time Is Running Out" – 6:30
"Midland Maniac" (Winwood) – 8:32

Side two
"Vacant Chair" (Winwood, Viv Stanshall) – 6:54
"Luck's In" – 5:23
"Let Me Make Something in Your Life" – 5:33

Personnel 
Track numbering refers to CD and digital releases of the album.

Musicians
 Steve Winwood – lead and backing vocals (all tracks), electric piano (1, 2, 5), synthesizer (1, 2, 4), electric guitar (1, 2, 5, 6), saxophone (1), organ (2, 3, 4, 6), clavinet (2), acoustic piano (3, 4, 6), harmonium (3), harpsichord (3), acoustic guitar (3), electric and acoustic basses (3), drums (3), percussion (3, 5)
 Junior Marvin – guitar (4)
 Willie Weeks – bass guitar (1, 2, 5, 6)
 Alan Spenner – bass guitar (4)
 Andy Newmark  – drums (1, 2, 5, 6)
 John Susswell – drums (4)
 Brother James – percussion (1, 4)
 Jim Capaldi – percussion (2), backing vocal (2)
 Rebop Kwaku Baah – congas (2, 5)
 Nicole Winwood (credited as "Nicole") – backing vocal (2)

Production
 Steve Winwood – producer
 Chris Blackwell – producer
 Mark Miller Mundy – associate producer
 Phill Brown – recording engineer 
 Robert Ash – assistant engineer
 Ray Doyle – assistant engineer
 Lee Hulko – mastering
 Fin Costello – photography 
 James Hutcheson – cover design, paintings

Charts

References

Steve Winwood albums
1977 debut albums
Island Records albums
Albums produced by Chris Blackwell
Albums produced by Steve Winwood